Éramos 4 is the seventh album of the Brazilian band Raimundos. It was launched in 2001, after the exit of the founding singer Rodolfo Abrantes. The disc contains basically cover songs of Ramones, played live with Marky Ramone, ex-drummer of the Ramones.

Track listing
"Sanidade" (Sanity)
"Desculpe, Mas Eu Vou Chorar" (Sorry, but I will cry) (Leandro & Leonardo cover)
"Nana Neném" (Sleep, Baby)
"Sheena Is A Punk Rocker"
"Rockaway Beach"
"Teenage Lobotomy"
"I Wanna Be Well"
"I Don't Care"
"Rock 'n' Roll High School"
"Needles And Pins"
"Do You Wanna Dance?"
"Pinhead"
"Blitzkrieg Bop"

Personnel
 Rodolfo - vocals except in track 1
 Digão - lead guitar, vocals in track 1,backing vocals
 Marquim – lead guitar  in track 1
 Canisso - bass guitar, backing vocals
 Fred Castro - drums in tracks 1-7

Special guests
 Marky Ramone - drums in tracks from 8 to 13

2001 albums
Raimundos albums
Ramones tribute albums